Admiral Francis Herbert Mitchell,  (10 January 1876 – 7 March 1946) was a Royal Navy officer who commanded the 3rd Battle Squadron and was President of the Dardanelles Committee in 1919.

Naval career
Mitchell was the son of Colonel Herbert Leonard Mitchell and Mary Arabella Susan Reynolds, the grandnephew of Major General John William Reynolds, and the great-grandson of General Charles Reynolds. Mitchell joined the Royal Navy in 1889, and was appointed lieutenant for gunnery duties on the pre-dreadnought battleship  on 10 May 1902.

Mitchell served in the First World War and, as commanding officer of the protected cruiser , saw action in the Dardanelles Campaign in 1915. He went on to be Naval Adviser to Commander-in-Chief Forces in Egypt in 1915, commanding officer of the training ship  in 1916 and Chief of Staff to the Commander-in-Chief, Portsmouth in 1917. After that he became commanding officer of the battleship  in 1918, commanding officer of the gunnery school  in 1920 and commanding officer of the battleship  in 1922.

Mitchell's final appointments were as commander of the 3rd Battle Squadron in 1926, and Admiral Superintendent of Malta Dockyard in 1928, before retiring in 1933.

Mitchell Report
In between these commissions, the Admiralty created a committee of officers in early 1919 to identify and summarise important lessons learned from the First World War. Then Commodore Mitchell was appointed the President of this Dardanelles Committee, entrusted to investigate the Attacks Delivered on and the Enemy Defenses of the Dardanelles Straits. Submitted in October 1919, the "Mitchell Report" as it became known drew a number of conclusions that were of relevance to future amphibious landings, including those of D-Day.

Personal life
Mitchell married Marion Russell in September 1901, daughter of Dr. Henry Russell. Their eldest son was Major General Francis Mitchell. Mitchell lost both his youngest son, Lieutenant Commander David Reynolds Mitchell, one week before the end of the Second World War in Europe (VE Day), and his brother, Major Charles Johnstone Mitchell, three weeks before the end of the First World War (Armistice Day). He was the first cousin of Major Douglas Reynolds, a Victoria Cross recipient, and the uncle of The Very Reverend Patrick Reynolds Mitchell. He died of pneumonia in 1946 at age 70.

References

1876 births
1946 deaths
Companions of the Order of the Bath
Companions of the Distinguished Service Order
Officiers of the Légion d'honneur
Royal Navy admirals